Jerry E. Martin  is an American attorney. He served as the United States Attorney for the Middle District of Tennessee.

Education
Martin graduated from Dartmouth College in 1996 and the Stanford University School of Law in 1999.

Legal career
From 1999 until 2000, Martin had been a litigation associate with Wyatt Tarrant & Combs. from 2000 until 2003 he was a litigation associate at Bass, Berry & Sims. Before his confirmation as United States Attorney he was previously  a partner at Barrett Johnston & Parsley from 2007 to 2010, he had been an associate at the same firm from 2003 until 2007.

United States Attorney
On March 25, 2010 President Barack Obama nominated Martin to be the United States Attorney for the Middle District of Tennessee. On May 6, 2010 his nomination was advanced through the United States Senate Committee on the Judiciary. On May 12, 2010 his nomination was confirmed by voice vote.

Post government career
After his departure as U.S. Attorney he has served as part of the faculty of Vanderbilt Law School. He returned to private practice, being a partner with Barrett, Johnston, Martin and Garrison, LLP.

References

External links
Profile at Barrett, Johnston, Martin and Garrison, LLP

Living people
Dartmouth College alumni
Stanford Law School alumni
Stanford Law School faculty
Tennessee lawyers
United States Attorneys for the Middle District of Tennessee
20th-century American lawyers
21st-century American lawyers
Year of birth missing (living people)